Aminotransferase class-V  is an evolutionary conserved protein domain. This domain is found in amino transferases, and other enzymes including cysteine desulphurase EC:4.4.1.-.                 
 
Aminotransferases share certain mechanistic features with other pyridoxal- phosphate dependent enzymes, such as the covalent binding of the pyridoxal- phosphate group to a lysine residue. On the basis of sequence similarity, these various enzymes can be grouped into subfamilies. This family is called class-V.

Subfamilies
Phosphoserine aminotransferase 
Cysteine desulfurase 
Cysteine desulphurase related, unknown function 
Cysteine desulphurases, SufS 
Cysteine desulphurase related 
2-aminoethylphosphonate—pyruvate transaminase

Human proteins containing this domain 
AGXT;      KYNU;      MOCOS;     NFS1;      PSAT1;     SCLY;      TLH6;

References 
 

Protein domains